Moreau de Tours is a name that can refer to:

 Jacques-Joseph Moreau, psychiatrist known for his works on haschish (cannabis resin)
 Georges Moreau de Tours, painter
 Paul Moreau de Tours, psychiatrist known for his works on suicide